Andreas Diesen (born 20 November 1945) is a Norwegian television presenter and revue historian.

In 2005 he was awarded the Leonard Statuette from the Norwegian Comedy Writers' Association. Having been assigned with NRK since 1965, he was awarded the King's Medal of Merit in 2012, for his contributions to entertainment in Norway.

Diesen was born in Oslo, a son of actors Ernst Diesen and Kari Diesen, and is a grandson of Andreas Melchior Seip Diesen, Harald Steen and Signe Heide Steen.

Selected works
 Biography.

References

External links 
  

1945 births
Living people
Television people from Oslo
Norwegian television presenters
NRK people